"Way to Go!" is a song by Australian electronic rock band Rogue Traders from their second album, Here Come the Drums (2005). It was released as the album's second single on 10 October 2005 and is the first release under the famous "Rogue Traders" logo. In the UK, the single had a different cover. The reason is that since the band had a new drummer, they were unable to use the original cover in the UK release.

Chart performance
"Way to Go!" debuted at number 15 on the Australian ARIA Singles Chart on 23 October 2005. In its second week on the chart, the song descended to number 17 but re-ascended to number 9 on its third week. During its fifth week, "Way to Go!" ascended to its peak at number 7, becoming the group's third top-ten single, and was certified gold by ARIA for shipping over 35,000 copies. "Way to Go!" was released as the group's third UK single on 28 May 2007, but it failed to chart.

Music video

The Australian video clip was filmed in Sydney, Australia and took a day to shoot. The clip is set in a university lecture, which transforms into a rock concert. The actual filming location was a decayed ballroom in a derelict building adjacent to Sydney's Central Railway Station. The clip stars the band's lead singer, Natalie Bassingthwaighte as the teacher, band member James Ash as the headmaster and a number of "students" who make up the audience for the band's performance (these were mainly fans who had responded to media calls for volunteer participants).

UK music video
A different video was shot for the UK release, which uses the Metro Radio Mix version of the song. The video premiered on The Box (UK music Channel) at 18:00 - 20:00. The first half of the video features the band performing on a street, and the second half features the band performing in front of a bright set of lights on a rooftop.
The video was shot on Cockatoo Island near Sydney.

Track listings
Australian CD single
 "Way to Go!" (original mix)
 "Way to Go!" (James Ash remix)
 "Way to Go!" (TV Rock remix)
 "Voodoo Child" (James Ash Lektric remix)

UK digital download single
 "Way to Go!" (Metro radio edit)
 "Way to Go!" (Dada remix edit)

Charts

Weekly charts

Year-end charts

Certification

Release history

References

2005 singles
2005 songs
APRA Award winners
Ariola Records singles
Columbia Records singles
Rogue Traders songs
Sony BMG singles
Songs written by James Ash